Lamentations 1 is the first chapter of the Book of Lamentations in the Hebrew Bible or the Old Testament of the Christian Bible, part of the Ketuvim ("Writings"). This book contains the elegies of prophet Jeremiah, as he laments the former excellence and present misery of Jerusalem, complaining of her grief; he confesses the righteousness of God's judgments and prays to God.

Text 

The original text was written in Hebrew language. The chapter is acrostic, divided into 22 stanzas or verses. The stanzas consist of triplets of lines (except Lamentations 1:7a, which contains four lines) each beginning with the letters of the Hebrew alphabet in regular order (twenty-two in number).

Textual versions
Some early witnesses for the text of this chapter in Hebrew are of the Masoretic Text, which includes Codex Leningradensis (1008). Fragments containing parts of this chapter in Hebrew were found among the Dead Sea Scrolls, i.e., 4Q111 (4QLam; 30‑1 BCE) with extant verses  1–15, 17, 16, 18 and 3Q3 (3QLam; 30 BCE–50 CE) with extant verses 10‑12.

There is also a translation into Koine Greek known as the Septuagint, made in the last few centuries BCE. The Septuagint translation added an introductory line before the first stanza:
And it came to pass, after Israel was taken captive, and Jerusalem made desolate, that Jeremias sat weeping, and lamented with this lamentation over Jerusalem, and said,

Extant ancient manuscripts of the Septuagint version include Codex Vaticanus (B; B; 4th century), Codex Sinaiticus (S; BHK: S; 4th century), Codex Alexandrinus (A; A; 5th century) and Codex Marchalianus (Q; Q; 6th century).

Verse 1

 How doth the city sit solitary,
 that was full of people!
 how is she become as a widow!
 she that was great among the nations,
 and princess among the provinces,
 how is she become tributary!
 "How" (Hebrew: איכה Eichah): the Hebrew word (the first word of the book, starting with "Aleph", the first letter of Hebrew alphabet) is the title more frequently given by the Jews to these Elegies. This is the characteristic introductory word of an elegy (cf.), and adopted as the title of the Book of Lamentations. It is repeated at the opening of chapter 2 and chapter 4.
 "Sit solitary": The city of Jerusalem here is "poetically personified and distinguished from the persons who accidentally compose her population". The word "solitary" does not mean "into solitude", but "deserted by her inhabitants" (the same word as in the first clause of : the fortified city is solitary, a habitation deserted and forsaken in the Revised Standard Version).
 "Great among the nations": one that "ruled over many nations" and, in the times of David and Solomon, received tribute from the Philistines, Edomites, Moabites, and Syrians, but later was forced to pay tribute herself, e.g. to Pharaoh Necho, king of Egypt, then, in the times of Jehoiakim until Zedekiah, to the king of Babylon.
 "Tributary" has the sense of "personal labor" .

Verse 7
 Jerusalem remembered in the days of her affliction
 and of her miseries all her pleasant things that she had in the days of old,
 when her people fell into the hand of the enemy, and none did help her:
 the adversaries saw her, and did mock at her sabbaths.
Mockery at her "sabbaths" reflects the wording in the Vulgate: deriserunt sabbata ejus. "Mocking over her downfall" is the standard translation in modern English versions. There is an alternative reading in 4QLam (4Q111), which reads:
 Remember O YHWH [al]l our pains that existed from days of old.
 When her [people] fell in/by the hand of a foe and there was no helper,
  her foes laughed about [ ] her ruins.

Verse 9
Her uncleanness is in her skirts;
She did not consider her destiny;
Therefore her collapse was awesome;
She had no comforter.
“O Lord, behold my affliction,
For the enemy is exalted!” 
This verses introduces a transition to the first person, similarly in verse 11b. "Such movement from one grammatical person to another, found throughout the book, is not at all unusual in Hebrew poetry".

Uses

Music
 The King James Version of verse 12 from this chapter are cited as texts in the English-language oratorio "Messiah" by George Frideric Handel (HWV 56).
 Edward Gibbons adapted some of the text in his verse anthem How hath ye City sate solitary.

See also
 Jacob
 Judah
 Jerusalem
 Zion
Related Bible parts: 2 Kings 25, 2 Chronicles 36, Jeremiah 39, Jeremiah 52, Ezekiel 24

Notes

References

Further reading
 Kotzé, Gideon. "The Qumran Manuscripts of Lamentations: A Text-Critical Study". Studia Semitica Neerlandica BRILL, 2013.

Sources

External links

Jewish
Lamentations 1 Hebrew with Parallel English
Lamentations 1 Hebrew with Rashi's Commentary

Christian
Lamentations 1 English Translation with Parallel Latin Vulgate

01